Stade Municipal is a multi-use stadium in Pointe-Noire, Republic of the Congo.  It is used for football matches and serves as the home of Association Sportive des Cheminots and Jeunesse Sportive les Bougainvillées. It holds 13,594 spectators.

Football venues in the Republic of the Congo
Sports venues in the Republic of the Congo
Buildings and structures in Pointe-Noire
Sports venues completed in 1975
1975 establishments in the Republic of the Congo